Jóannes Lamhauge (born 25 December 1985) has designed a range of Faroese postage stamps. As well, he has illustrated educational materials for the Faroese School system.

References

Faroese artists
Living people
1985 births
People from Tórshavn